Arthromeris elegans is a species of ferns in the subfamily Drynarioideae. It is found in Burma and China (Xizang Zizhiqu and Yunnan).

References

External links 

 Arthromeris elegans at The Plant List
 Arthromeris elegans at Tropicos

Polypodiaceae
Plants described in 1941
Flora of Myanmar
Flora of Tibet
Flora of Yunnan